State Route 43 (SR-43) is a state highway in the U.S. state of Utah. While running east–west from border-to-border, the route passes through Manila.

The road became a state highway in 1918, and was assigned a number in 1927. In 1960, due to the construction of the Flaming Gorge Reservoir, a portion was realigned.

Route description
The route begins at the Wyoming border southeast of McKinnon and continues south as a two-lane road before turning southeast. When it intersects Birch Creek Road, the route curves to the east. Before the junction of Bennion Lane southwest of Manila, the highway turns northeast to enter through the south side of Manila. After the route turns due east through town and exits the county seat of Daggett County before curving northeast again to terminate at the Wyoming border, where the road continues as Highway 530.

History
The road running east–west through Manila, between Wyoming and Wyoming, became a state highway in 1918, and was numbered SR-43 in 1927. Due to the creation of the Flaming Gorge Reservoir, the east end was moved west in 1960 to bypass the now-flooded community of Linwood.

Major intersections

References

043
 043